Malechowo may refer to the following places:
Malechowo, Kołobrzeg County in West Pomeranian Voivodeship (north-west Poland)
Malechowo, Sławno County in West Pomeranian Voivodeship (north-west Poland)
Malechowo, Szczecinek County in West Pomeranian Voivodeship (north-west Poland)